Sharon G. Flake (born December 24, 1955) is an American writer of children and young adult literature. She has lived in Pittsburgh, Pennsylvania, with her daughter for many years. She is a graduate of the University of Pittsburgh with a BA in English.

Flake's debut novel The Skin I'm In which was published in 1998 follows thirteen-year-old Maleeka Madison who is teased about the color of her skin and her homemade dresses. To end the bullying, Maleeka tries to befriend her tormentors. She learns that trying to fit in is not the best way to make people like you. Flake's work has won numerous awards, including the John Steptoe Award for New Talent in 1999 for new authors and has also garnered positive feedback from Booklist and School Library Journal. She has also won two Coretta Scott King Awards.

Biography
Flake was born in Philadelphia.  She is the second youngest child, with three brothers and two sisters, and grew up in an inner-city neighborhood. Her father worked for Philadelphia Gas Co., while her mother did days work and raised her cream children.  Through their guidance, Flake and her siblings were encouraged to be themselves, learning about culture through music, TV, politics, and books. As a teenager, she attended Simon Gratz High School, where she was a member of the tennis team and the honor society.

Flake earned her bachelor's degree from the University of Pittsburgh in 1978, majoring in English Writing and minoring in Political Science. During this time, she had an internship at the University's public relations office, and wrote for The Pitt News. Immediately after graduating she took a job as a house parent in a Pittsburgh area youth shelter. She later went on to work with young people in foster care. From 1987 until 2005, Flake returned to the University of Pittsburgh public relations department where she eventually became a supervisor, then went on to become Director of Public Relations at the University's Joseph M. Katz Graduate School of Business.

Flake continued to work at Pitt, while also writing nonfiction for local and national magazines. Periodically, she also wrote pieces for Pitt's alumni publication.

When her daughter Brittney was born, Flake's interest in writing grew stronger. She often credits her daughter's birth with launching her fiction writing career. "If she weren't born", Flake says, "I'm not sure I ever would have become a consistent enough writer to make this journey. Her birth gave me the inspiration and dedication I needed to stay the course." Flake wrote short stories for her daughter, and read them at her daughter's daycare. She went on to write "The Luckiest Sister", a story about two twins who lead different lives because of their different skin colors. It was the winner of the August Wilson short story contest, published in AIM magazine.
  
Flake later won a scholarship to, and attended, the Highlights for Children writing conference in Chautauqua. Her first novel, The Skin I'm In, was published in 1998 under the new Jump at the Sun imprint of Disney's, launched about September 1998 to produce "children's books with an African-American emphasis". In ten years she wrote six novels or story collections published by Jump at the Sun.

In her spare time, Flake enjoys gardening and reading.

Books 
 The Skin I'm In (Jump at the Sun/ Hyperion Books for Children, 1998)
 Money Hungry (Jump at the Sun, 2001)
 Begging for Change (Jump at the Sun, 2003) – sequel to Money Hungry
 Who Am I Without Him?: Short stories about girls and the boys in their lives (Jump at the Sun, 2004)
 Bang! (Jump at the Sun, 2004)
 The Broken Bike Boy and the Queen of 33rd Street (Jump at the Sun, 2007), illustrated by Colin Bootman
 You Don't Even Know Me: Stories and poems about boys (Jump at the Sun, 2010) 
 Pinned (Scholastic Press, 2012)
 Unstoppable Octobia May (Scholastic Press, 2014) 
 You Are Not a Cat (Boyds Mills Press, 2016)
 The Life I'm In (Scholastic Press, 2021)

References

External links 

 
 Sharon G. Flake profile at AALBC.com 
 Sharon Flake (no date) at WQED OnQ (audio-video)
 Sharon Flake biography (summer 2007) at the Pennsylvania Center for the Book
 
 

1955 births
Living people
20th-century American novelists
21st-century American novelists
African-American novelists
American young adult novelists
Writers from Pittsburgh
University of Pittsburgh alumni
American women novelists
Women writers of young adult literature
Novelists from Pennsylvania
20th-century American women writers
21st-century American women writers
20th-century African-American women writers
20th-century African-American writers
21st-century African-American women writers
21st-century African-American writers